Syngnathus macrophthalmus is a pipefish species, found only around Suez and Hurghada (Al Ghardaqah) in the northwestern Red Sea. It is a marine tropical demersal fish, up to  total length.

References
 

macrophthalmus
Fish described in 1915
Fish of the Red Sea
Fish of Africa
Taxa named by Georg Duncker